At the 2009 Geneva Motor Show, Ferrari unveiled the track-only iteration of the 599 GTB, dubbed the 599XX. Inspired by Ferrari's Formula One cars, the car has many changes over the standard car in order to make it more nimble and responsive on a race track.

Specifications 
Exterior enhancements included two winglets on the C-pillars for improved downforce, a vented bonnet for improved engine cooling, darkened lexan tail lamps, a carbon fibre 'ducktail' rear spoiler aiding further in downforce, a large rear diffuser for improved under body airflow, tow hooks at the front and rear, additional ducts for improved cooling, a minimalist race interior with racing bucket seats along with an LCD display behind the steering wheel replacing all analogue gauges equipped with a roll-cage and lexan sliding windows. The air conditioning system was retained for added driver comfort. The car had nine traction and stability control modes, all controlled from the manettino dial on the steering wheel. The car was equipped with F1 inspired carbon ceramic brakes with crossed drilled rotors and a new race exhaust system. Weight was reduced by reducing the weight of the engine components such as a new carbon fibre intake manifold and graphite coated pistons along with a lightweight crankshaft, as well as through the use of composite materials and the use of carbon fibre body parts. A new gearbox was introduced to cut overall gear change time to 60 milliseconds, holding the upward or downward shift paddle for longer resulted in multiple shifts that improved gearing time. The car also included 29/67 R19 front and 31/71 R19 rear racing slicks with 19 × 11J wheels at the front and 19 × 12J at the rear. The 599XX had a price of $1.5 million when it debuted.

Records 
At the 2010 Beijing International Auto Show, Ferrari announced that the 599XX had completed the Nordschleife circuit at the Nürburgring in a time of 6 minutes and 58.16 seconds – the fastest time ever recorded for a production-derived sports car. This lap was later beaten by the Pagani Zonda R in June 2010, which had set a lap time of 6 minutes and 47.50 seconds.

599XX Evo 

On November 10, 2011, the first images of the 599XX Evo surfaced, which had a radically restyled aero and exhaust package as well as electronic upgrades and Pirelli racing slicks. On 1 December 2011, Ferrari confirmed details for the 599XX Evo in preparation for the 2011 Bologna Motor Show. One of the key features of the Evo is its active rear wing which can adjust automatically to provide increased cornering performance.

References

External links

Ferrari 599XX Official Website
Ferrari 599XX Evo Official Website

599 GTB
2010s cars
Rear-wheel-drive vehicles